Shkëlzen (Maja e Shkëlzenit) is a mountain in Albania with a height of . It is rocky and located near the border with Kosovo, north of Tropojë and within the Highlands of Gjakova. It belongs to the Accursed Mountains range. Shkëlzen shares its name with a village that is just south of the mountain.

References

Mountains of Albania
Accursed Mountains